Abigale Lee Miller (born September 21, 1965) is an American television personality who founded the Abby Lee Dance Company, which appeared on the reality television series Dance Moms for eight seasons.

Early life
Miller was born in Pittsburgh, Pennsylvania in 1965, to Maryen Lorrain Miller (1927-2014), a dance teacher and studio owner, and George L. Miller (1927 - 2000).

Career in dance
Miller grew up around dance in Penn Hills, Pennsylvania, a Pittsburgh suburb, studying under her mother's direction at the Maryen Lorrain Dance Studio. In 1980, at age 14, Miller was given the responsibility for choreographing and coaching for one of her mother's dance competition teams. Miller eventually took over the studio in 1995 and renamed it Reign Dance Productions.

Miller became certified by Dance Masters of America and became a member of Dance Masters of Pennsylvania Chapter #10 in 1986, but her membership was terminated in February 2012, with DMA saying Miller's reality-TV show Dance Moms was "a total misrepresentation of our dance educators and their students and is detrimental to the dance profession."

Career in reality television

In 2011, Miller began appearing in the Lifetime reality television show Dance Moms where she taught dancing for many years. Miller appeared on the show for seven seasons through October 2017. Dance Moms follows the practice sessions and performance competitions of young students of the Abby Lee Dance Company.

Three spin-offs of Dance Moms are Abby's Ultimate Dance Competition, which ran for two seasons and 22 episodes; Dance Moms: Miami; and Dance Moms: Abby's Studio Rescue. The latter ran for only 7 episodes. Miller has also been a guest judge on Dancing with the Stars. In 2014, Miller published a book, Everything I Learned about Life, I Learned in Dance Class.

In 2015, Miller opened a new studio set up in Los Angeles called ALDC LA. In March 2017, Miller announced she had quit the series. In July 2018, Miller announced her return for season 8 of Dance Moms. Dance Moms: Resurrection premiered June 4, 2019 on Lifetime.

In 2016, Miller appeared on The Eric Andre Shows season 4 premiere.

Miller announced on Instagram on May 4, 2020, that she will be leaving Dance Moms and Lifetime after nine years.

There are rumors of the show's return on a new network, facilitated by Miller in an interview with Pop Crave.

Legal and financial problems
On December 3, 2010, Miller filed for bankruptcy after owing more than $400,000 in back taxes to the IRS. Soon afterward, she was hired for Dance Moms, with filming beginning on April 6, 2011. Episodes began airing in July 2011, and Miller's financial situation improved.

Miller began to encounter numerous legal problems in 2014. One of the dancers on Dance Moms sued Miller, charging assault. The suit further claims the show's producers encourage a violent and combative atmosphere on the show as a way to attract viewers. A $5 million lawsuit was filed against Collins Avenue Entertainment for staging disagreements that ended in a fight between Kelly Hyland and Miller. Paige Hyland also filed an emotional distress lawsuit against Miller. The claims were dropped on the emotional distress lawsuit.

On October 13, 2015, Miller was indicted by the DOJ for fraud for creating a secret bank account between 2012 and 2013 used to hide income from masterclasses, TV deals, and merchandise sales, in addition to failing to file required monthly reports of income with the bankruptcy court for 13 months. She was indicted for bankruptcy fraud, concealment of bankruptcy assets and false bankruptcy declarations in hiding some $755,000. If found guilty, she could have faced a fine of $250,000 for each of the 20 counts she was indicted on (collectively $5,000,000) and five years in prison. She pleaded not guilty in November 2015. By February 2016, the case was delayed a fifth time. Shortly after her indictment, she was charged with customs fraud relating to undeclared cash from Dance Moms Australia master class tour. Miller reached a deal with the IRS criminal investigators to enter a guilty plea to reduced charges on June 27, 2016.

Sentencing was originally set for October 11, 2016. It was postponed three times: first to January 20, 2017; then to February 24, 2017; and finally to May 8, 2017.

On May 9, 2017, after a two-day hearing, Miller was sentenced to one year and a day in federal prison, followed by two years of supervised release. Miller also paid a $40,000 fine, a $120,000 judgment and gave a DNA sample relating to her felony charge.

On July 12, 2017, Miller reported to the Victorville Federal Correctional Institution in Victorville, California, to begin serving her prison sentence.

On March 27, 2018, Miller was transferred to a Long Beach, California halfway house to complete her sentence. After receiving time off for good behavior, she was released on May 25.

Personal life
Miller has never been married and has no children, quoting that she “loved the studio more than family”. In April 2018, she was diagnosed with Burkitt lymphoma, a type of non-Hodgkin's lymphoma cancer, after spinal surgery. In September of that year, Miller's lymphoma went into remission and she began physical therapy to relearn how to walk.

References

External links
 

1965 births
Living people
21st-century American criminals
American choreographers
American female criminals
American female dancers
American people convicted of fraud
American people of English descent
American people of Irish descent
American prisoners and detainees
American women choreographers
American women television personalities
Criminals from Pennsylvania
Dance teachers
Dancers from Pennsylvania
Participants in American reality television series
Prisoners and detainees of the United States federal government
Television personalities from Pittsburgh